Michael G. (Mike) Archbold is an American businessman in the retail industry and the former chief executive officer of GNC.

Career
Prior to GNC, Archbold served as chief executive officer of Talbots from August 2012 to August 2014. He also served as the president of The Vitamin Shoppe from April 2011 to June 2012.  In addition, Archbold served as chief financial officer at Saks Fifth Avenue and AutoZone.

Education
Archbold received his bachelor's of science degree in accounting from the Fairfield University Dolan School of Business in 1982.

References

External links
GNC website

American retail chief executives
Living people
Fairfield University Dolan School of Business alumni
Year of birth missing (living people)